Colinton is a hamlet in northern Alberta, Canada within Athabasca County.

The Hamlet of Colinton consists of two designated places defined by Statistics Canada – Colinton and McNabb's – as well additional lands south of McNabb's that is not currently located within either designated place.

James Maurice Milne, owner of the land on which the railway station was built, named the hamlet after Colinton, Scotland, his birthplace.  Previously Colinton was known as Kinnoull.

Demographics 

See also 
List of communities in Alberta
List of designated places in Alberta
List of hamlets in Alberta

References 

Athabasca County
Hamlets in Alberta
Designated places in Alberta